Federico Simonti (born 14 June 2000) is an Italian professional footballer who plays as a left back for  club Trento.

Club career
Born in Bagno a Ripoli, Simonti started his career in Fiorentina Primavera. He was the captain of the team, and won two Coppa Italia Primavera.

On 28 August 2020, he was loaned to Serie C club Pistoiese. He made his professional debut on 27 September 2020 against Alessandria.

On 20 July 2021, he left Fiorentina and signed with Serie C club Trento.

References

External links
 
 

2000 births
Living people
People from Bagno a Ripoli
Sportspeople from the Metropolitan City of Florence
Italian footballers
Association football fullbacks
Serie C players
Eccellenza players
ACF Fiorentina players
U.S. Pistoiese 1921 players
A.C. Trento 1921 players
Footballers from Tuscany